James Edward Harris (born May 13, 1968) is a former professional American football player who played defensive end for six seasons for the Minnesota Vikings, the St. Louis Rams, and the Oakland Raiders.

1968 births
Living people
Sportspeople from East St. Louis, Illinois
Players of American football from Illinois
American football defensive ends
Temple Owls football players
Minnesota Vikings players
St. Louis Rams players
Oakland Raiders players